Steno, the artistic name of Stefano Vanzina (19 January 1917 – 13 March 1988), was an Italian film director, screenwriter and cinematographer. Two of his films, Un giorno in pretura (1954) and Febbre da cavallo (1976), were shown in a retrospective section on Italian comedy at the 67th Venice International Film Festival.

Selected filmography
 Abandonment (1940)
 In High Places (1943)
 Two Hearts Among the Beasts (1943)
 Annabella's Adventure (1943)
 Black Eagle (1946)
 The Courier of the King (1947)
 The Captain's Daughter (1947)
 Fear and Sand (1948)
 The Wolf of the Sila (1949)
 Toto Looks for a House (1949) 
 A Night of Fame (1949)
 A Dog's Life (with Mario Monicelli, 1950)
 The Knight Has Arrived! (with Mario Monicelli, 1950)
 Her Favourite Husband (1950)
 The Elusive Twelve (1950)
 The Ungrateful Heart (1951)
 Cops and Robbers (with Mario Monicelli, 1951)
 Toto in Color (1952) 
 Le infedeli (1953)
 Man, Beast and Virtue (1953)
 Un americano a Roma (1954)
 A Day in Court (1954)
 Le avventure di Giacomo Casanova (1955)
 Nero's Weekend (1956)
 Totò nella luna (1958)
 I Tartassati (1959)
 Tempi duri per i vampiri (1959)
 Totò, Eva e il pennello proibito (1959)
 Letto a tre piazze (1960)
 The Two Colonels (1962)
 Copacabana Palace (1962)
 Totò Diabolicus (1963)
 Toto vs the Four (1963)
 Letti sbagliati (1965)
 Caprice Italian Style (1968)
 Execution Squad (1972)
 Flatfoot (1973)
 Policewoman (1974)
 Febbre da cavallo (1976)
 Double Murder (1977)
 Amori miei (1978)
 La patata bollente (1979)
 Dr. Jekyll Likes Them Hot (1979)
 Quando la coppia scoppia (1981)
 Banana Joe (1982)
 An Ideal Adventure (1982)

References

External links

1917 births
1988 deaths
Italian film directors
20th-century Italian screenwriters
Italian male screenwriters
Italian cinematographers
Writers from Rome
Poliziotteschi directors
Burials at the Cimitero Flaminio
20th-century Italian male writers
Comedy film directors
Italian parodists
Parody film directors